George Washington Stanton (June 19, 1906 – January 1, 1992) was an American Major League Baseball right fielder who played for the St. Louis Browns in . He was used as a pinch hitter in twelve of his thirteen games.

External links

1906 births
1992 deaths
Baseball players from North Carolina
Evansville Bees players
Knoxville Smokies players
Major League Baseball outfielders
Milwaukee Brewers (minor league) players
People from Stantonsburg, North Carolina
San Antonio Missions players
St. Louis Browns players
Tampa Smokers players
Wichita Falls Spudders players
Wilson Bugs players